Even Now may refer to:

Music

Albums
Even Now, Nana Mouskouri 1979
 Even Now (Barry Manilow album) 1978
 Even Now (Conway Twitty album), 1991
Even Now (EP), an EP by Natalie LaRue
 Even Now (Foolish Things album)

Songs
 "Even Now" (Barry Manilow song), 1978
 "Even Now" (Bob Seger song), 1983
 "Even Now" (Exile song), 1991
 "Even Now", by Sara Evans from Three Chords and the Truth, 1997